Joseph Clarke (born 1986) is an Irish hurler who played as a midfielder for the Westmeath senior team.

Born in Castletown Geoghegan, County Westmeath, Clarke first arrived on the inter-county scene at the age of sixteen when he first linked up with the Westmeath minor team, before later joining the under-21 side. Clarke made his senior debut during the 2005 Christy Ring Cup. Since then he has won three Christy Ring Cup medals and one National League (Division 2) medal.

At club level Clarke is a two-time championship medallist with Castletown Geoghegan.

Honours

Team

Castletown Geoghegan
Westmeath Senior Hurling Championship (2): 2004, 2013
Westmeath Under-21 Hurling Championship (2): 2005, 2006
Westmeath Minor Hurling Championship (2): 2002, 2003

Westmeath
Christy Ring Cup (3): 2005, 2007, 2010
National League (Division 2) (1): 2008

References

1986 births
Living people
Castletown Geoghegan hurlers
Westmeath inter-county hurlers